Random Lake is a village in Sheboygan County, Wisconsin, United States. The population was 1,594 at the 2010 census. It is part of the Sheboygan, Wisconsin Metropolitan Statistical Area.

Geography
Random Lake is located at  (43.552, -87.960).

Demographics

2010 census
As of the census of 2010, there were 1,594 people, 659 households, and 441 families living in the village. The racial makeup of the village was 95.4% White, 0.4% African American, 0.3% Native American, 0.6% Asian, 2.2% from other races, and 1.1% from two or more races. Hispanic or Latino of any race were 4.5% of the population.

There were 659 households, of which 31.7% had children under the age of 18 living with them, 54.2% were married couples living together, 8.5% had a female householder with no husband present, 4.2% had a male householder with no wife present, and 33.1% were non-families. 26.4% of all households were made up of individuals, and 10% had someone living alone who was 65 years of age or older. The average household size was 2.42 and the average family size was 2.94.

The median age in the village was 40.3 years. 24% of residents were under the age of 18; 6.7% were between the ages of 18 and 24; 27.4% were from 25 to 44; 29% were from 45 to 64; and 13% were 65 years of age or older. The gender makeup of the village was 50.8% male and 49.2% female.

2000 census
As of the census of 2000, there were 1,551 people, 613 households, and 424 families living in the village. The population density was 1,217.9 people per square mile (471.5/km2). There were 656 housing units at an average density of 515.1 per square mile (199.4/km2). The racial makeup of the village was 97.42% White, 0.58% Native American, 0.13% Asian, 0.26% Pacific Islander, 0.77% from other races, and 0.84% from two or more races. Hispanic or Latino of any race were 1.61% of the population.

There were 613 households, out of which 34.1% had children under the age of 18 living with them, 55.8% were married couples living together, 9.0% had a female householder with no husband present, and 30.8% were non-families. 25.6% of all households were made up of individuals, and 11.4% had someone living alone who was 65 years of age or older. The average household size was 2.53 and the average family size was 3.02.

In the village, the population was spread out, with 27.0% under the age of 18, 7.9% from 18 to 24, 31.9% from 25 to 44, 20.4% from 45 to 64, and 12.8% who were 65 years of age or older. The median age was 37 years. For every 100 females, there were 100.1 males. For every 100 females age 18 and over, there were 101.6 males.

The median income for a household in the village was $45,938, and the median income for a family was $51,979. Males had a median income of $37,813 versus $23,510 for females. The per capita income for the village was $21,892. About 3.7% of families and 5.4% of the population were below the poverty line, including 8.4% of those under age 18 and 5.4% of those age 65 or over.

Education
Random Lake is home to Random Lake High School, a public school that serves approximately 400 students from the village and the surrounding area. The school was established in 1929 and its current structure constructed in 1959. The mascot for Random Lake High School is the Ram and the school colors are royal blue and silver.

Random Lake had one parochial school, Our Lady of the Lakes, a Roman Catholic school that enrolled about 60 students.  Our Lady of the Lakes was forced to close after dropping enrollment rates.

Images

See also
 List of villages in Wisconsin

References

External links

 
 Random Lake Area Chamber of Commerce

Villages in Sheboygan County, Wisconsin
Villages in Wisconsin